Maurice Patrick McDermott (21 February 1923 – 9 February 1988) was an English professional footballer who played as a full-back in the Football League for York City, in non-League football for Consett and Annfield Plain, and was on the books of Sunderland without making a league appearance.

References

1923 births
1988 deaths
Footballers from County Durham
English footballers
Association football fullbacks
Consett A.F.C. players
Sunderland A.F.C. players
York City F.C. players
Annfield Plain F.C. players
English Football League players